Elisabeth Fanghol (born 11 June 1983) is a Norwegian politician for the Labour Party.

She was elected as deputy representative to the Parliament of Norway from Akershus for the term 2017–2021. In total she met during 13 days of parliamentary session.

References

1983 births
Living people
Labour Party (Norway) politicians
Deputy members of the Storting
Asker politicians
Women members of the Storting
Place of birth missing (living people)
21st-century Norwegian women politicians
21st-century Norwegian politicians